The Journal of Texture Studies is a peer-reviewed scientific journal that covers research on the texture and sensory perception of food and other consumer products. In 2011 the journal redefined its scope to better reflect the broadening and increasingly interdisciplinary nature of texture and sensory perception research. The journal was established in 1969 and is published by Wiley-Blackwell.

References

External links 
 

Bimonthly journals
Wiley-Blackwell academic journals
English-language journals
Publications established in 1969
Food science journals